Pierre-Marie Taramarcaz (born April 23, 1968) from Verbier is a Swiss ski mountaineer.

Taramarcaz was born in Martigny VS and has been member of the national team since 1998.

Selected results 
 1996:
 1st, Patrouille de la Maya A-course, together with Daniel Hediger and Laurent Perruchoud
 2000:
 1st, Patrouille de la Maya A-course, together with Jean-Yves Rey and Jean-Daniel Masserey
 2001:
 2nd, Swiss Cup, scratch (and 1st seniors)
 2002:
 6th, World Championship single race
 2003:
 2nd, Trophée des Gastlosen, together with Pius Schuwey
 5th, European Championship single race
 5th, European Championship team race (together with Alexander Hug)
 7th, European Championship combination ranking
 2004:
 1st, Patrouille de la Maya A-course, together with Jean-Yves Rey and Sébastien Epiney
 1st, Trophée des Gastlosen, together with Florent Troillet
 8th, World Championship combination ranking 
 9th, World Championship single race
 10th, World Championship team race (together with Florent Troillet)
 2006:
 10th, World Championship team race (together with Didier Moret)
 2009:
 2nd, Trophée des Gastlosen, together with Jean-Yves Rey

Pierra Menta 

 2001: 7th, together with Jean-François Cuennet
 2005: 6th, together with Christian Pittex

Patrouille des Glaciers 

 2000: 2nd (and 1st in "seniors I" class ranking), together with Jean-Yves Rey and Jean-Daniel Masserey
 2004: 2nd, together with Jean-Yves Rey and Jean-Daniel Masserey
 2008: 2nd, together with Jean-Yves Rey and Jean-Daniel Masserey

External links 
 Pierre-Marie Taramarcaz at Skimountaineering.org

References 

1968 births
Living people
Swiss male ski mountaineers
People from Martigny
Sportspeople from Valais